The Force India VJM03 was a Formula One motor racing car designed and built by the Force India team for the  season. It was driven by Adrian Sutil and Vitantonio Liuzzi and was unveiled online, on 9 February 2010. The car made its track début the following day at the second group test at Circuito de Jerez. In Bahrain, Sutil finished first in FP1. Sutil and Liuzzi then qualified 10th and 12th respectively. Liuzzi finished ninth, scoring two points, while Sutil spun in an oil leak caused by Mark Webber in the Red Bull before finishing outside the points, in twelfth position.

Complete Formula One results
(key) (results in bold indicate pole position; results in italics indicate fastest lap)

 Driver failed to finish, but was classified as they had completed >90% of the race distance.

References

External links

Force India Formula One cars